2015 Consadole Sapporo season.

J2 League

References

External links
 J.League official site

Consadole Sapporo
Hokkaido Consadole Sapporo seasons